Ivano may refer to:

People
 Ivano Baldanzeddu (born 1986), Italian football player
 Ivano Balić (born 1979), Croatian handballer
 Ivano Bamberghi (born 1949), Italian speed skater
 Ivano Beggio (1944–2018), Italian businessman
 Ivano Bertini (born 1968), Italian astronomer
 Ivano Blason1923–2002), Italian football player
 Ivano Bonetti (born 1964), Italian football player
 Ivano Bordonborn 1951), Italian football player
 Ivano Brugnetti (born 1976), Italian race walker
 Ivano Bucci (born 1986), Sammarinese sprinter
 Ivano Camozzi (born 1962), Italian alpine skier
 Ivano Ciano (born 1983), Italian football player
 Ivano De Matteo (born 1966), Italian director, screenwriter, and actor
 Ivano Della Morte (born 1974), Italian football player
 Ivano Dionigi (born 1948), Italian lecturer and rector
 Ivano Edalini (born 1961), Italian alpine skier
 Ivano Fontana (1926–1993), Italian boxer
 Ivano Fossati (born 1951), Italian pop singer
 Ivano Ghirardini (born 1953), French mountaineer
 Ivano Lussignoli (1972–2003), Italian sprint canoer
 Ivano Maffei (born 1958), Italian cyclist
 Ivano Marescotti (born 1946), Italian actor
 Ivano Marzola (born 1963), Italian alpine skier
 Ivano Newbill (born 1970), basketball forward
 Ivano Sacchetti Sacchetti, Italian manager
 Ivano Staccioli (1927–1995), Italian film actor
 Ivano Trotta (born 1977),, Italian football player
 Ivano Vendrame (born 1997), Italian swimmer
 Ivano Zanatta (born 1960), Italian ice hockey player
 Ivano Zasio (born 1973), Italian lightweight rower
 Paul Ivano (1900–1984), Serbian–French–American cinematographer

Places
 Castel Ivano, Italy
 Ivano-Fracena, Italy
 Ivano-Frankivsk, Ukraine
 Ivano-Frankove, Ukraine
 Ivano-Hannivka, Ukraine
 Ivano-Kazanka, Russia
 Ivano-Kuvalat, Russia

Italian masculine given names